Fraus pteromela is a moth of the family Hepialidae. It is found in most of the southern half of Australia.

The wingspan is about 25 mm for males and 35 mm for females.

References

Moths described in 1892
Hepialidae